Finolex Cables Limited is an Indian manufacturer of electrical and telecommunication cables based in Pune, Maharashtra. It is the flagship company of the Finolex Group, established in 1958.
The company also manufactures polyvinyl chloride (PVC) sheets for roofing, signage and interiors. Its manufacturing facilities are located at Pimpri and Urse in Pune as well as at Goa and Uttarakhand.

References

Manufacturing companies based in Pune
Manufacturing companies established in 1958
Wire and cable manufacturers
Indian companies established in 1958
Indian brands
Companies listed on the National Stock Exchange of India
Companies listed on the Bombay Stock Exchange